This is a list of polka artists. It includes notable musicians and musical groups that play polka.

Notable artists
 Slavko Avsenik
 Eddie Blazonczyk, The Versatones
 Brave Combo,Texas, alternative, two-time Grammy Award winner
 The Bravery
 Tom Brusky - Wisconsin
 The Chardon Polka Band, Ohio
 Walter Dana polka promoter and founder of Dana Records
 Eläkeläiset
 Myron Floren
 FreezeDried
 Global Kryner, Austrian band/pop/jazz/polka
 Romy Gosz
 Walt Groller
 Happy Louie and Julcia's Polka Band
 Walter Jagiello - Li'l Wally
 The Knewz 
 Harold Loeffelmacher, Dutchman/Oompah
 Loituma
 Walter Ostanek, Canada,  three-time Grammy Award winner, Slovenian-Canadian
 Polka Floyd
 Polkacide, San Francisco punk-polka band
 POLKAHOLIX (Berlin Speed Polka) (Germany)
 The Mike Schneider Polka Band, Slovenian-style polka band from Milwaukee, WI
 Six Fat Dutchmen
 Walt Solek, the "Clown Prince of Polka"
 Jimmy Sturr, United States, eighteen Grammy Awards
 Those Darn Accordions
 Lawrence Welk, South Dakota
 Whoopee John Wilfahrt
 Fritz's Polka Band
 "Weird Al" Yankovic (Every studio album except his self-titled debut and "Even Worse" has a polka medley on it of popular music)
 Frankie Yankovic, Slovenian-American

References

See also
Grammy Award for Best Polka Album
Polka Hall of Fame

Polka
P
Polka groups